is a Japanese former professional motorcycle road racer. He won three World Superbike Championship races and finished on the podium on 20 further occasions.

Career
He started racing on mini-bikes before becoming Japan's 250cc champion in 1989. He moved to his homeland's Superbike championship in 1993. By  Kawasaki considered him ready for the Superbike World Championship.

Initial testing displays and results suggested that they were not wrong. At the A1-Ring, Yanagawa became the first Japanese rider to win a Superbike World Championship race outside his homeland, also winning Sugo later in the year to come 4th overall.  was dominated by two huge crashes. At Monza the bike hurtled through the gravel at the Ascari Chicane before catching fire due to a burst fuel line, with Yanagawa nowhere near it. At Laguna Seca he was running 2nd when Doug Chandler's wild card Kawasaki went out of control on the run into the Corkscrew corner and harpooned Yanagawa. It was a frightening moment, yet Yanagawa only missed one further round. He was classified 2nd in that race, as the restart was abandoned following another pile-up. On his return he took two 4th places, and followed this with two podium results at Sugo. This was good for 7th overall.

Yanagawa raced in Japan's Superbike series while testing this, and briefly raced it before returning to a testing role. He continued in the All-Japan series, leading it in 2007 before losing out to Atsushi Watanabe, and also entered for a one-off MotoGP round at Motegi in 2007.

Career statistics

Superbike World Championship

Races by year

Grand Prix motorcycle racing

By season

Races by year
(key) (Races in bold indicate pole position, races in italics indicate fastest lap)

References

External links
Profile on MotoGP.com
Profile on WorldSBK.com

Superbike World Championship riders
Kawasaki Motors Racing MotoGP riders
1971 births
Japanese motorcycle racers
Living people
People from Kagoshima Prefecture
MotoGP World Championship riders